Little Lady is a 1949 Italian comedy film directed by Mario Mattoli and starring Gino Bechi, Antonella Lualdi and Aroldo Tieri. It was shot at the Farnesina Studios in Rome and on location around Introdacqua in L'Aquila. The film's sets were designed by the art director Mario Rappini. It earned around 66 million lira at the box office.

Plot
Two young steal a car and drive up into the hills of Abruzzo. There they are mistaken by the inhabitants of a town as the wealthy cousins of a young woman who lives there Maria.

Cast
 Gino Bechi as Don Cesare Balestri
 Antonella Lualdi as Maria Censi
 Aroldo Tieri as Un ladro
 Ave Ninchi as Iris
 Aldo Silvani as Ernesto De Blasi
 Dina Sassoli as Carmela
 Vinicio Sofia as Modesto Rinaldi
 Ughetto Bertucci as Un ladro
 Aldo Bufi Landi as Bruno de Blasi
 Ada Dondini as Cesira, la governante
 Enzo Garinei as Assistante del notaio 
 Inga Gort as Monica
 Enrico Viarisio as Comm. Gegé Lapicella

References

Bibliography
 Aprà, Adriano. The Fabulous Thirties: Italian cinema 1929-1944. Electa International, 1979.
 Chiti, Roberto & Poppi, Roberto. Dizionario del cinema italiano: Dal 1945 al 1959. Gremese Editore, 1991.

External links

1949 films
1949 comedy films
Italian comedy films
1940s Italian-language films
Italian black-and-white films
Films directed by Mario Mattoli
1940s Italian films